North East Island is the main island of the Snares Island group at  approximately  south of New Zealand's South Island. Off the South Promontory lies Broughton Island, the second largest island in the group. South off the western peninsula coast lies the islet Alert Stack and off the North Promontory lies the North and South Daption Rocks.

Climate
North East Island's precipitation occurs mostly during the months of December–May, drier weather then settles in until December.

See also

 New Zealand Subantarctic Islands
 List of Antarctic and subantarctic islands#List of subantarctic islands
 List of islands of New Zealand
 List of islands
 Desert island

References

Islands of the Snares Islands / Tini Heke
Important Bird Areas of the Snares Islands